The New York Life Building is a 12-story,  high-rise in the Library District of downtown Kansas City, Missouri. The brick and brownstone tower, which was completed in 1890, generally is regarded as Kansas City's first skyscraper and was the first building in the city equipped with elevators. It was commissioned by the New York Life Insurance Company, which also used the same design for the Omaha National Bank Building in Omaha that was completed in 1889. Several buildings around the world share its name. A centerpiece of the Library District and Baltimore Avenue Historic District, the building is located amid historic structures such as the Kansas City Club and the Central Library.

Background
The building was designed in 1885 by Frederick Elmer Hill of the New York City architecture firm of McKim, Mead & White. Hill, who graduated from the Massachusetts Institute of Technology in 1882, came to Kansas City in 1885 initially to oversee the construction of his design but ended up staying until 1901, when he designed other notable buildings. From 1893 until 1895, he was involved in the design and construction of what is today Grace and Holy Trinity Cathedral on nearby Quality Hill. Hill also designed Convention Hall.

Built in Italianate Renaissance Revival style, the New York Life Building has a brick and brownstone exterior and an H-shaped footprint with ten-story wings flanking a twelve-story tower. A monumental bald eagle tending eaglets in a nest is perched above the main entry. The work was sculpted by Louis St. Gaudens and contains more than two tons of cast bronze. With an Italian granite atrium floor in the lobby, the building's location marked the first significant movement of the city south from its founding at the River Market along the Missouri River. The imposing structure also marked a dramatic change in the skyline of Kansas City, where the tallest buildings previously had been three or four stories.

In 1970, the New York Life Building was added to the National Register of Historic Places. In 1988, however, it was abandoned. In 1996, a $35 million restoration of the building added modern energy, communications, and environmental features.

Purchased by the Roman Catholic Diocese of Kansas City-Saint Joseph in 2010 for $11.7 million, the building now houses the diocese's administrative offices (the chancery), totaling about 180 employees. The building was renamed the Catholic Center.

See also
 Tallest buildings in Kansas City

References

Towers in Missouri
Skyscraper office buildings in Kansas City, Missouri
1890s architecture in the United States
McKim, Mead & White buildings
Office buildings on the National Register of Historic Places in Missouri
New York Life Insurance Company
National Register of Historic Places in Kansas City, Missouri
Library District (Kansas City, Missouri)
Commercial buildings completed in 1888
1888 establishments in Missouri